My Friend Maigret is a 1949 detective novel by the Belgian writer Georges Simenon featuring his character Jules Maigret. The book was translated into English by Shaun Whiteside.

References 

1949 French novels
Maigret novels
1949 Belgian novels